The 14th Terengganu State election was held on 9 May 2018, concurrently with the 2018 Malaysian general election.. The previous state election was held on 5 May 2013. The state assemblymen is elected to 5 years term each.

The Terengganu State Legislative Assembly would automatically dissolve on 17 June 2018, the fifth anniversary of the first sitting, and elections must be held within sixty days (two months) of the dissolution (on or before 17 August 2018, with the date to be decided by the Election Commission), unless dissolved prior to that date by the Head of State (Sultan of Terengganu) on the advice of the Head of Government (Menteri Besar of Terengganu).

Pan-Malaysian Islamic Party (PAS) won the state election with 22 seats out of 32, and were able to wrestle control of the state from Barisan Nasional (BN), who only won 10 seats. PAS therefore has its first government of Terengganu since the 2004 state election, when they lost to BN. Pakatan Harapan (PH) candidates all lost in this election, and thus were unrepresented in the Terengganu Assembly. Ahmad Samsuri Mokhtar from PAS were sworn in as the new Menteri Besar on 10 May 2018.

Contenders

Barisan Nasional (BN) is set to contest all 32 seats in Terengganu State Legislative Assembly. Barisan Nasional (BN) linchpin party United Malays National Organisation (UMNO) is to set to contest major share of Barisan Nasional (BN) seats.

Pan-Malaysian Islamic Party (PAS) is set to contest all 32 seats in Terengganu.

Pakatan Harapan has decided to contest all 32 seats in Terengganu. However, Pakatan Harapan has yet to finalize the seats. Pakatan Harapan will finalize the remaining the seats before 23 February 2018.

Political parties

The contested seats

Election pendulum 
The 14th General Election witnessed 22 governmental seats and 10 non-governmental seats filled the Terengganu State Legislative Assembly. The government side has 3 safe seats and 4 fairly safe seats, while the non-government side has just a safe and fairly safe seat each one.

Results

Seats that changed allegiance

References

Terengganu state elections
Terengganu
Terengganu